Budkovce a village and municipality in Michalovce District in the Kosice Region of eastern Slovakia.

History
In historical records the village was first mentioned in 1319.

Geography
The village lies at an altitude of 102 metres and covers an area of  (2020-06-30/-07-01).

Ethnicity
The population is almost entirely Slovak in ethnicity.

Population 
Its population is  1,508 people (2020-12-31).

Government
The village relies on the tax and district offices, police force and fire brigade at Michalovce although the village has its own birth registry.

Economy
The village has a post office, a Slovak bank and insurance company and a number of food stores.

Sports
The village has a football pitch and a gymnasium.

Genealogical resources
The records for genealogical research are available at the state archive "Statny Archiv in Kosice, Presov, Slovakia"

 Roman Catholic church records (births/marriages/deaths): 1850-1895 (parish A)
 Greek Catholic church records (births/marriages/deaths): 1756-1904 (parish B)
 Reformed church records (births/marriages/deaths): 1793-1938 (parish B)

Gallery

See also
 List of municipalities and towns in Michalovce District
 List of municipalities and towns in Slovakia

References

External links

https://web.archive.org/web/20071217080336/http://www.statistics.sk/mosmis/eng/run.html
Surnames of living people in Budkovce

Villages and municipalities in Michalovce District
Zemplín (region)